Pseudiberus zenonis is a species of land snail, a terrestrial pulmonate gastropod mollusc in the family Bradybaenidae.

Description
The shell of Pseudiberus zenonis has five whorls. Its height is 7–8 mm, and its diameter is 17–20 mm.

Habitat and behavior
These snails tend to live on steep slopes. They are very active. They eat plants. In winter, they bury themselves in the soil.

Distribution
This species is only found in Shandong, China.

References

Bradybaenidae
Gastropods described in 1882